Brunvoll Glacier is a broad glacier flowing north to the coast between Murray Monolith and Torlyn Mountain on the east and Scullin Monolith and Mikkelsen Peak on the west. The name was suggested by Bjarne Aagaard for the brothers Arnold and Saebjorn Brunvoll, Norwegian whaling captains who explored along this coast in the Seksern in January 1931.

See also
 List of glaciers in the Antarctic
 Glaciology

References
 

Glaciers of Mac. Robertson Land